Road signs in Cambodia (Khmer: ឧបសម្ព័ន្ធស្តីពីសញ្ញាចរាចរផ្លូវគោក) are standardized road signs are similar to those used in Europe but much of it resembles road signage systems used in South American countries with certain differences. The designs of road signage match their neighbours of Thailand and Malaysia, both of which adopt a modified version of the South American road signage system (despite both Thailand and Malaysia being part of Asia). Until the early 1980s, Cambodia closely followed American, European, Australian, and Japanese practices in road sign design, with diamond-shaped warning signs and circular restrictive signs to regulate traffic. Unlike Thailand and Malaysia, Cambodia does not use the FHWA Series fonts ("Highway Gothic") typeface, favouring Helvetica instead. 

Cambodia traffic signs use Khmer, the national language of Cambodia, however, English is also used for stop and important public places such as tourist attractions, airports, railway stations, and immigration checkpoints. Both Khmer and English are used on directional signage. Cambodia signed the Vienna Convention on Road Signs and Signals but have yet to ratify the convention.

Prohibitory signs

Mandatory signs

Priority signs

Warning signs

Temporary signs

Direction signs

Built-up area and boundary signs

Street name signs

Information signs

Supplementary signs 56

Signposts

Delineator post

Guide post (at dangerous curve)

chevron maker (to the right)

Chevron maker (to the left)

Object maker (on the left)

Object maker (on the curve)

Object maker (on the right)

Railway crossing post

Road markings

References

Cambodia
Transport in Cambodia